New Year's Eve is a 2011 American romantic comedy film directed by Garry Marshall. The film consists of an ensemble cast consisting of Halle Berry, Jessica Biel, Jon Bon Jovi, Abigail Breslin, Chris "Ludacris" Bridges, Robert De Niro, Josh Duhamel, Zac Efron, Héctor Elizondo, Katherine Heigl, Ashton Kutcher, Joey McIntyre, Seth Meyers, Lea Michele, Sarah Jessica Parker, Sarah Paulson, Michelle Pfeiffer, Til Schweiger, Jake T. Austin, Hilary Swank, and Sofía Vergara.

New Year's Eve is the second in an unofficial trilogy of romantic comedy films directed by Garry Marshall, set on a one-day holiday and featuring an ensemble cast in a variety of stories, the other films being Valentine's Day (2010) and Mother's Day (2016). New Year's Eve was released on December 9, 2011, received generally negative reviews from critics but grossed $142 million.

Plot
New Year's Eve follows several interconnected stories of people experiencing various problems on New Year's Eve.

Vice-President of the Times Square Alliance Claire Morgan  is making the final arrangements for the ball drop with the help of her friend, police officer Brendan. Meanwhile, after being nearly run over by a car and denied a vacation, Ahern Records secretary Ingrid Withers quits her job and offers deliveryman Paul Doyle tickets for the Ahern Records Masquerade Ball if he helps her complete her New Year's resolutions before midnight, and he accepts.

Paul's older sister Kim Doyle is having trouble with her teenage daughter Hailey, who wants to spend New Year's Eve with her friends and her boyfriend Seth Anderson in Times Square, though Kim wants to spend the New Year with her after her divorce. Paul's best friend, comic book illustrator Randy, hates New Year's Eve as his girlfriend left him on a date, gets stuck in an elevator with Elise, an aspiring singer providing back-up for musician Daniel Jensen at his Times Square show. Jensen is also preparing to perform at the Ahern Records ball while attempting to rekindle his relationship with his ex-fiancée, Laura.

At a nearby hospital, Claire's father Stan Harris, in the final stages of cancer who refuses chemotherapy and wishes only to see the ball drop one last time, is kept company by Nurses Aimee and Mindy after his doctor reveals he will not last much longer. In the same hospital, a young couple (Griffin and Tess Byrne) are about to have their first child, and compete with another couple, James and Grace Schwab, for a bonus offered to the family of the first child born in the New Year.

Elsewhere, Sam Ahern, Jr., a businessman and son of the late founder Sam Ahern, Sr. of Ahern Records, attempts to go to the Ahern Records Ball to deliver an important speech. After his car malfunctions in nearby Connecticut, all the while wondering if he should reunite with a mysterious woman he met and fell in love with on the previous New Year's Eve. Failing to find a mechanic or tow truck, Sam is able to get a ride from a cheerful family in an RV.

Later that evening, one of the LED panels on the Times Square Ball malfunctions, jamming the ball and forcing Claire to call “Kominsky”, a disgruntled electrician whom the company had fired a few weeks prior. He repairs the ball before midnight, and, in gratitude, she leaves him in charge of the operation as she rushes to see the ball drop with her father, Stan. Meanwhile, Nurse Aimee has a video conference with her husband Chino, a soldier deployed in Afghanistan. Stan passes away just minutes after Claire snuck him up to the roof of the hospital to watch the ball drop, amid a chorus of "Auld Lang Syne", with Claire weeping beside him, holding his hand.

Paul helps Ingrid complete all the items on her list, and she gives him the tickets. They later say goodbye, but Paul decides to take her to the Ahern Records ball as his date. Meanwhile, Randy and Elise bond in the elevator as they share their lives and problems. Just as they are about to kiss, the elevator is repaired by the building superintendent and Elise rushes to Jensen's show. Randy notices she forgot her rubber bracelet and rushes to give it to her, still in pajamas. At Times Square, Jensen leaves midway through his show to return to the Ahern Ball to apologize to Laura, who takes him back and leaves with Sam's approval. With Jensen gone, Elise replaces him and attracts the attention of the crowd. She kisses Randy, and they start a romantic relationship.

Griffin and Tess have their baby and, although it is born first, they lie to allow James and Grace to have the $25,000 bonus after discovering they already have two other children to provide for. Meanwhile, after being forbidden from attending the celebration, Hailey runs away to Times Square, where she sees Seth being kissed by another girl, Lily, unaware that it was a kiss against his will. Heartbroken, she meets and is comforted by her mother. Kim finally realizes that she was too selfish for not allowing Hailey to spend the New Year with them. Seth finds them and apologizes, revealing Lily had stolen the kiss. Hailey forgives him and kisses him back. Her mother allows her to go to an after-party.

Kim then rushes to a restaurant to reunite with Sam, who had succeeded in delivering his speech. She is revealed to be the mysterious woman whom he met one year prior, and they finally share their names with each other. The film ends with Paul and Ingrid having fun at the Ahern Records ball party. As the credits roll, a series of bloopers and blunders are shared with the audience.

Cast

 Jake T. Austin as Seth Anderson
 James Belushi as Building Super
 Halle Berry as Nurse Aimee
 Jessica Biel as Tess Byrne
 Michael Bloomberg as himself
 Jon Bon Jovi as Daniel Jensen
 Abigail Breslin as Hailey Doyle
 Ludacris as Lieutenant Brendan Nolan
 Matthew Broderick as Mr. Buellerton
 Robert De Niro as Stan Harris
 Josh Duhamel as Sam Ahern, Jr.
 Zac Efron as Paul Doyle
 Héctor Elizondo as Lester Kominsky
 Cary Elwes as Stan's Doctor
 Carla Gugino as Dr. Morriset
 Katherine Heigl as Laura
 Cherry Jones as Mrs. Rose Ahern
 Ashton Kutcher as Randy
 John Lithgow as Jonathan Cox
 Joey McIntyre as Rory 
 Katherine McNamara as Lily Bowman
 Seth Meyers as Griffin Byrne
 Lea Michele as Elise
 Alyssa Milano as Nurse Mindy
 Sarah Jessica Parker as Kim Doyle
 Russell Peters as Sunil
 Michelle Pfeiffer as Ingrid Withers 
 Sarah Paulson as Grace Schwab
 Ryan Seacrest as himself 
 Til Schweiger as James Schwab
 Hilary Swank as Claire Morgan
 Sofía Vergara as Ava
 Nat Wolff as Walter
 Common as Chino

Reception

Critical reception
On review aggregation website Rotten Tomatoes, the film has an approval rating of 7% based on 142 reviews and an average rating of 3.20/10. The site's critical consensus reads, "Shallow, sappy, and dull, New Year's Eve assembles a star-studded cast for no discernible purpose." On Metacritic, the film has a score of 22 out of 100 based on 30 critics, indicating "generally unfavorable reviews." Audiences polled by CinemaScore gave the film an average grade of "B+" on an A+ to F scale.

Roger Ebert of the Chicago Sun-Times said, "New Year's Eve is a dreary plod through the sands of time until finally the last grain has trickled through the hourglass of cinematic sludge. How is it possible to assemble more than two dozen stars in a movie and find nothing interesting for any of them to do?" Kimberley Jones of the Austin Chronicle said, "Mostly, New Year's Eve is appalling stuff, a poorly constructed, sentimental sham. Auld Lang Syne." Claudia Winkleman on the BBC One show Film... said, "I have found the worst film of all time, and it is called New Year's Eve."  Rolling Stone shared the same opinion and rated it zero stars, stating, "Director Garry Marshall follows last year's Valentine's Day romcom crapfest with an even more puke-up-able sample of the species," and concluding, New Year's Eve is "bad beyond belief." British newspaper The Telegraph named New Year's Eve one of the ten worst films of 2011. British film critic Mark Kermode named it as the worst film of 2011. On the more positive side, Entertainment Weeklys Owen Gleiberman said, "New Year's Eve is dunderheaded kitsch, but it's the kind of marzipan movie that can sweetly soak up a holiday evening."

Box office
The film opened at the No. 1 spot at the box office with $13 million. It made $54.5 million in the United States and Canada, as well as $87.5 million in other countries, for a worldwide total of $142 million.

Accolades
The film earned five Razzie Award nominations: Worst Picture, Worst Director (Garry Marshall), Worst Actress (Sarah Jessica Parker), Worst Screenplay and Worst Screen Ensemble, losing all to Adam Sandler's Jack and Jill.

Parodies
New Year's Eve, and its predecessor Valentine's Day, were parodied in December 2011 on the sketch comedy series Saturday Night Live in a trailer for the fictional film The Apocalypse, set on the last day on Earth. They were similarly parodied on the TV show 30 Rock, in the January 2012 episode "The Ballad of Kenneth Parcell", in a trailer for a film called Martin Luther King Day, whose large cast includes Jenna Maroney.

References

External links
 
 
 
 
 
 
 

2011 films
Films set around New Year
American romantic comedy films
Films directed by Garry Marshall
Films set in 2011
Films set in New York City
Films shot in New York City
New Line Cinema films
Warner Bros. films
Films scored by John Debney
Michael Bloomberg
2010s English-language films
2010s American films